Pratapsingh Raoji Rane (born 28 January 1939) is an Indian politician from the state of Goa. He has served as the Chief Minister of Goa a record seven times and was also the former Leader Of Opposition in the Goa Legislative Assembly. He has been a Member of Legislative Assembly, Goa for over 50 years. In 2022, the Pramod Sawant led Government conferred life long cabinet status on Rane. 

Rane has been a member of the Indian National Congress since the mid-1970s, and was earlier a prominent figure in the Maharashtrawadi Gomantak Party. In the MGP, he was minister for law and also held other portfolios, in the term beginning 1972.

Early life 

Rane completed his primary education in SSPMS Boarding school, Pune and later got his BBA degree in the United States. He comes from the prominent Maratha family of the Ranes that dominated politics out of their home in the north eastern pocket of Sattari in Goa. They have had a set of revolts and peace treaties with the Portuguese while the latter were ruling Goa. The family traces their roots to the Rane clan of Marathas.

He dominated politics in Goa for the entire decade of the 1980s, and for part of the 1990s. His achievements include the launching of the Kadamba Transport Corporation government-run bus transport system in Goa which had a poor transportation system, which could still do with further improvements. He started Schools and Colleges in rural areas.

During his tenure as a Chief Minister, and also the Goa University was established. He built a network of all weather roads connecting villages and Towns in Goa. Number of Industrial Estates and Industrial Training Institutes were stated during his tenure which helped Goa to industrialise.

He undertook to build small and big Irrigation Projects in various parts of Goa. He is also a founder member of the International Centre Goa and a founder member of Goa Institute of Management, a premier Management Institute in India.

Political career 

In the 1980s, dissidents within the ruling Congress party sought to dislodge Rane from power, by appealing to New Delhi mostly unsuccessfully. Some of his later tenures in power earned criticism allegedly because of growing corruption during his regime. He was leader of the Opposition while the Bharatiya Janata Party (BJP) ruled Goa from the late-1990s until early 2005. His critics, like the then editor of the local Goa newspaper Herald or O Heraldo, Rajan Narayan criticised Rane for not doing enough as the leader of the Opposition.

Rane became chief minister after the Congress's first-ever win in Goa in 1980 mainly as a "consensus candidate", after a bitter battle for the top political slot between the then two Congress heavyweights, Dr Wilfred de Souza and Ananta Narcina Naik, also known as Babu Naik. Naik was subsequently largely marginalised in state politics, while Souza served under Rane in some of his cabinets.

After 5 years of BJP rule, Rane began his fifth term as chief minister in February 2005 after the government fell due to a split in the Goa BJP. A month later, however, the state was put under president’s rule for three months. Rane then served as chief minister for the sixth time, for two years until the June 2007 state elections. Though the Congress Party and its allies won a comfortable majority, Rane was forced to step aside as chief minister due to infighting within the state Congress party, and was forced to step aside in favor of a neutral candidate, Digambar Kamat. Rane was, however, elected speaker of the state assembly when it reconvened a few days later. Mangalorean.Com- Serving Mangaloreans Around The World!

Personal 

By profession, Rane is an agriculturist. He is married. He enjoys reading and watching Marathi Drama and also enjoys English Theatre and Western and Indian Classical Music. He loves playing the Piano.

Controversy

After the BJP attempted a "show of strength" to take over the Goa house, they were stifled by Rane. The BJP accused Rane of acting in a partisan manner to protect the Congress led government.

He has also been accused by businessman, Bhalchandra Naik for demanding Rs 10 crore for being granted Environmental clearance for a mine, of which Rs 6 crore had been paid to his son Vishwajit Rane, MLA from Valpoi. 

In 2018, Rane was caught in another controversy, where he called Goan emigrants from United Kingdom, "toilet cleaners". He was asked for an explanation by the state party president, Girish Chodankar.

References

External links
 Goa Assembly - Chief Minister Profile, official version

1939 births
Living people
Indian National Congress politicians from Goa
Chief Ministers of Goa
Speakers of the Goa Legislative Assembly
Leaders of the Opposition in Goa
Chief ministers from Indian National Congress
Maharashtrawadi Gomantak Party politicians
People from North Goa district
Goa MLAs 2017–2022
Indian National Congress (U) politicians
Goa, Daman and Diu MLAs 1972–1977
Goa MLAs 1977–1980
Goa MLAs 1980–1984
Goa MLAs 1984–1989
Goa MLAs 1989–1994
Goa MLAs 1994–1999
Goa MLAs 1999–2002
Goa MLAs 2002–2007
Goa MLAs 2007–2012
Goa MLAs 2012–2017